On 23 May 2013, it was announced by the New Zealand Rugby Union that following a successful tour in 2012, the Māori All Blacks will tour North America to take on Canada and the United States. The fixtures would not be the first time the national sides have met the invitational side, as the teams participated in the now defunct Churchill Cup, and the Māoris faced Canada during their 2012 tour where the Māoris were victorious 32-19. The head coach for the tour was announced as Taranaki's head coach Colin Cooper. He was assisted by Crusaders assistant coach Tabai Matson, and former All Black Carl Hoeft as the scrummage coach.

Fixtures

Canada

United States

Squad

New Zealand Māori 29-man squad for the 2013 North America November Tour, facing Canada (3 November) and United States (9 November).

 Head Coach –  Colin Cooper

Note: Bold denotes players that have represented the Māori All Blacks in previous tours.
Note: Flags indicate national union as has been defined under IRB eligibility rules. Players may hold more than one non-IRB nationality.

Squad notes
Tim Bateman took captaincy from Tanerau Latimer, who has made himself unavailable to have surgery on a long-standing arm injury. Several players were not considered due to injury including Ross Filipo and Bronson Murray. Ash Dixon replaced Corey Flynn after being ruled out of the tour through injury. Hika Elliot and Piri Weepu sustained injuries during the North American Tour and were replaced by Quentin MacDonald and Chris Smylie.

Player statistics
Key
Con: Conversions
Pen: Penalties
DG: Drop goals
Pts: Points

References

Maori All Blacks
Māori All Blacks tours
Rugby union tours of Canada
Rugby union tours of the United States
2013 in American rugby union
2013 in Canadian rugby union
2013 in New Zealand rugby union